Pnětluky (until 1923 Netluky) is a municipality and village in Louny District in the Ústí nad Labem Region of the Czech Republic. It has about 400 inhabitants.

Administrative parts
The village of Konětopy is an administrative part of Pnětluky.

Etymology
The name Pnětluky is derived from a term referring to people who beat the trunks hard. The name Konětopy means "drowning the horses" and was likely used mockingly.

Geography
It lies in the Džbán geomorphological region. The Pnětlucký brook of local importance flows through the municipality.

History
The first written mention of Pnětluky is from 1250, Konětopy was first mentioned in 1357. The first fortress was established here in the 14th century, but in 1466, it was already abandoned. In the 15th century, Pnětluky was owned by members of the Kolowrat family. They had built the Pravda Castle and established the Pravda estate, which included Pnětluky and Konětopy.

In 1523, the estate was bought by the Lobkowicz family. They had a new fort built in Pnětluky, which has been preserved to this day. During the Thirty Years' War, the village was devastated, including a church from the mid-14th century. The Pravda estate was then merged with Divec and later with Cítoliby. From 1802 to the 20th century, the Cítoliby estate was property of the House of Schwarzenberg. Since the first half of the 19th century, Konětopy was known for its hops.

Demographics

Economy
Hops is the most important agricultural commodity in the area.

Sights

Remains of the Pravda Castle are located on the eponymous hill above the village. It ceased to be an aristocratic residence in the 16th century. It has been a tourist destination since the 18th century and is used for social and cultural purposes.

The Church of Saint Matthew is a late Baroque building from 1765.

References

External links

 

Villages in Louny District